The American animated science fiction sitcom Futurama, created and developed by Matt Groening and David X. Cohen for the Fox Broadcasting Company, aired on Fox from March 28, 1999, to August 10, 2003.

Following a commitment from 20th Century Fox Television to produce four straight-to-DVD Futurama films, Comedy Central announced in June 2006 that they were resurrecting the show and would air the films as new Futurama episodes, reconfiguring each film into four episodes, to constitute a fifth season. Comedy Central broadcast the first film on March 23, 2008. Following the four films, Comedy Central broadcast a sixth season of twenty-six episodes, split over 2010 and 2011. A seventh season was announced in March 2011 and debuted in 2012. The show aired its final episode on September 4, 2013. In February 2022, Hulu revived the series with a 20-episode order set to premiere in 2023.

The original 72-episode run of Futurama was produced as four seasons; Fox broadcast the episodes out of the intended order, resulting in five aired seasons. As consequence, the show's canon is disrupted by the broadcast order. For example, the episode "Fry and Leela's Big Fling" follows on from the ending of the previous episode in production order (which is "T.: The Terrestrial"), however, the previous episode in broadcast order is "2-D Blacktop". This was not intended by the show's creators. Moreover, different regions and networks use different ordering for the episodes. Some countries broadcast Futurama in the intended four-season order. In the UK, the first 13 episodes of the series' second run were released on DVD/BD as "season five", which is entirely different to the "season five" shown by Fox. This list features the episodes in original production order, as featured on the DVD box sets.

Series overview
Fox broadcast many episodes of the original four production seasons of Futurama out of order (though the first season was aired completely in order), resulting in five broadcast seasons. Comedy Central chose to air the parts of season 6 and 7 out of order as well. This list follows the season box sets, which feature the episodes in the original, intended production season order, ignoring the order of broadcast.

Episodes

Season 1 (1999)

Season 2 (1999–2000)

Season 3 (2001–02)

Season 4 (2002–03)

Season 5 (2008–09)

Season 6 (2010–11)

Season 7 (2012–13)

Season 8
On February 9th, 2022 it was announced that Hulu would be reviving the series for Season 8 that will consist of 20 episodes.

Specials

Everybody Loves Hypnotoad

Included on the DVD release of Bender's Big Score is a full-length 22-minute episode of Everybody Loves Hypnotoad, titled "Amazon Adventure", based on the fictional show produced by Hypnotoad. "Amazon Adventure" begins with an establishing shot of a house, before immediately cutting to Hypnotoad hypnotizing the audience. Other establishing shots and advertisements are interspersed throughout the episode.

Futurama: The Lost Adventure

The Futurama video game was released shortly after the airing of the 72nd episode in August 2003. The game's story and dialogue were written by J. Stewart Burns, and the voice direction was by David X. Cohen. According to Cohen, the half-hour's worth of cutscenes in the game were originally written as "the 73rd episode of the original series." These cutscenes were compiled together (along with footage of the video game being played) and released as a bonus feature on the DVD release of The Beast with a Billion Backs. Renamed Futurama: The Lost Adventure, the episode tells of how the Planet Express crew prevented Mom from using Earth to take over the Universe.

Futurama Live!

Futurama Live! first aired on July 11, 2012 on Comedy Central following the original broadcast of the episode "Zapp Dingbat", the public were given the chance to participate in a live chat with the Futurama cast and crew. Several previews of then-upcoming Season 7 episodes were shown during the live stream, and several details about the season were revealed, including: returning appearances by the characters Guenter and Dr. Banjo in an episode of broadcast season 10, the debut of Lrrr's son, an episode about the origins of Scruffy, a three-part episode featuring 1980s-style animation, the status of Mars, and the possibility of "Möbius strip clubs". One lucky fan even won a prize.

A second episode of Futurama Live! was aired as a live Internet webcast event broadcast on September 4, 2013 on the Comedy Central website and the Nerdist YouTube channel as part of the Futurama series finale. It was broadcast in two parts, the first part was the pre-show hosted by Chris Hardwick and featured Futurama creator Matt Groening, series showrunner David X. Cohen and voice actors Phil Lamarr and Lauren Tom. The second part was the post-series finale webcast again hosted by Hardwick with Groening and Cohen and actors Maurice LaMarche and Billy West discussing the series finale and different aspects of the show.

Radiorama

Radiorama is a special podcast episode of Futurama made for the Nerdist Podcast to help promote Futurama: Worlds of Tomorrow reuniting the entire Futurama cast  as well as special guest star Chris Hardwick as the villain, Klaxxon. The podcast was released on September 14, 2017. The episode was written by David X. Cohen, Ken Keeler and Patric M. Verrone.

Home media

See also
 "Simpsorama" (2014) – a crossover episode of The Simpsons

References

External links
 List of Futurama episodes by production order at The Infosphere
 List of Futurama episodes by broadcast order at The Infosphere
 
 
 

 
Episodes
Futurama episodes, List of
Futurama episodes, List of
Futurama episodes, List of